Scripture is that portion of literature deemed authoritative for establishing instructions within any of a number of specific religious traditions, especially the Abrahamic religions

Scripture or Scriptures may also refer to:

 Religious education, in British schools
 Scripture: No Word Needed, by French Canadian composer Jean-Pierre Isaac
 People with surname Scripture:
 Bill Scripture (1941–2018), American baseball player
 Edward Wheeler Scripture (1864–1945), American physician and psychologist
 Scriptures (Benediction album)
 Scriptures (Tee Grizzley album)
 Scriptures (band)